Oiseau may refer to:
 HMS Oiseau
 French ship Oiseau, ships of the French Navy
 "Oiseau", a section of Eunoia, an anthology of univocalics by Christian Bök

See also
 Oiseaux (disambiguation)